Chichester Psalms is an extended choral composition in three movements by Leonard Bernstein for boy treble or countertenor, choir and orchestra. The text was arranged by the composer from the Book of Psalms in the original Hebrew. Part 1 uses Psalms 100 and 108, Part 2 uses 2 and 23, and Part 3 uses 131 and 133. Bernstein scored the work for a reduced orchestra, but also made a version for an even smaller ensemble of organ, one harp, and percussion.

The work premiered at the Philharmonic Hall in New York City on 15 July 1965, conducted by the composer. That was followed by a performance at Chichester Cathedral as part of the festival, for which it was commissioned, on 31 July that year, conducted by John Birch.

History
The work was commissioned for the 1965 Southern Cathedrals Festival at Chichester Cathedral by the cathedral's Dean, Walter Hussey. However, the world premiere took place in the Philharmonic Hall, New York, on 15 July 1965 with the composer conducting, followed by the performance at Chichester on July 31, 1965, conducted by the cathedral's Organist and Master of the Choristers, John Birch.

The first performance in London took place on 10 June 1966 in the Duke's Hall of the Royal Academy of Music. Conducted by Roy Wales and performed by the London Academic Orchestra and London Student Chorale, it was paired with Britten's Cantata academica. It was published in 1965 by Boosey & Hawkes.

Chichester Psalms was Bernstein's first composition after his 1963 Third Symphony (Kaddish). These two works are his two most overtly Jewish compositions. While both works have a chorus singing texts in Hebrew, the Kaddish Symphony has been described as a work often at the edge of despair, while Chichester Psalms is affirmative and serene at times.

On 24 November 2018, as the finale of the Bernstein in Chichester celebrations to mark the centenary of Bernstein's birth, the choirs of Chichester Cathedral, Winchester Cathedral and Salisbury Cathedral again joined forces to sing Chichester Psalms in Chichester Cathedral. They were accompanied by the Bournemouth Symphony Orchestra conducted by Marin Alsop, a former pupil of Bernstein. The treble solo was sung by the Chichester Head Chorister, Jago Brazier. Alexander Bernstein, Bernstein's son, was in the audience, as he had been in 1965.

Text and music 
Bernstein made his own selection from the psalms, and decided to retain the original Hebrew for an ecumenical message, focused on the "brotherhood of Man".

Introduction
Psalm 108 (verse 2 in the King James Version; verse 3 in Hebrew)

The introduction (presented in the score as part of movement one) begins gathering energy. Word painting is used in that the dissonant sevenths present in every chord sound like clanging bells, indicating that we are being told to awaken in a deep and profound way. In the first measure, Bernstein also introduces a leitmotif in the soprano and alto parts consisting of a descending perfect fourth, ascending minor seventh, and descending perfect fifth. The motif is also found with the seventh inverted as a descending major second. It conjures up images of tuning the harp and psaltery (especially the use of perfect fourths and fifths). This leitmotif is found elsewhere in the work, including the end of the first movement ("Ki tov Adonai," m. 109–116), the third movement prelude, and in the soprano part of the final a cappella section of movement three ("Hineh mah tov," m.60), with a haunting reintroduction of the material in the harp on unison G's during the "Amen" of m. 64.

First movement
Psalm 100

The first movement is in a joyous  meter, sung in a festive fashion, as is implored in the first verse of the psalm. Its last words, "Ki tov Adonai," recall the 7th interval presented as the main theme in the introduction. The rhythm is essentially a  meter, but the last half beat is missing giving the feeling of a rushed energy in which the last half beat is skipped in order to hurry to the next measure.

Second movement

The second movement begins with the Psalm of David set in a conventional meter with a tranquil melody, sung by the boy treble (or countertenor), and repeated by the soprano voices in the chorus. This is abruptly interrupted by the orchestra and the low, rumbling sounds (again word painting) of the men's voices singing Psalm 2 (also notably featured in Handel's Messiah). This is gradually overpowered by the soprano voices (with the direction—at measure 102 in the vocal score only—"blissfully unaware of threat") with David serenely reaffirming the second portion of Psalm 23.  However, the last measures of the movement contain notes which recall the interrupting section, symbolizing mankind's unending struggle with conflict and faith.

The music for the beginning of the second movement is taken from sketches from Bernstein's unfinished The Skin of Our Teeth. The men's theme was adapted from material cut from West Side Story.

Third movement
Psalm 131

The third movement begins with a conflicted and busy instrumental prelude which recapitulates the chords and melody from the introduction, then suddenly it breaks into the gentle chorale set in a rolling  meter (subdivided as ) which recalls desert palms swaying in the breeze.

Finale
Psalm 133, vs. 1

The finale comes in from the third movement without interruption. The principal motifs from the introduction return here to unify the work and create a sense of returning to the beginning, but here the motifs are sung pianississimo and greatly extended in length. Particularly luminous harmonies eventually give way to a unison note on the last syllable of the text—another example of word painting, since the final Hebrew word, Yaḥad, means "together" or, more precisely, "as one". This same note is that on which the choir then sings the Amen, while one muted trumpet plays the opening motif one last time and the orchestra, too, ends on a unison G, with a tiny hint of a Picardy third.

Scoring 
In the score, Bernstein notes that the soprano and alto parts were written "with boys' voices in mind," and that it is "possible but not preferable" to use women's voices instead. However, he states that the male alto solo "must not be sung by a woman," but either by a boy or a countertenor. This was to reinforce the liturgical meaning of the passage sung, perhaps to suggest that Psalm 23, a "Psalm of David" from the Hebrew Bible, was to be heard as if sung by the boy David himself.

The orchestra consists of 3 trumpets in B, 3 trombones, timpani, a five-person percussion section, 2 harps, and strings. A reduction written by the composer pared down the orchestral performance forces to organ, one harp, and percussion.

Music 
The Psalms, and the first movement in particular, are noted for the difficulty they pose for the performers. For example, the opening is difficult for the tenors, owing to the unusually wide vocal range, rhythmic complexity, and the consistent presence of strange and difficult-to-maintain parallel 7ths between the tenor and bass parts. The interval of a seventh figures prominently throughout the piece because of its numerological importance in the Judeo-Christian tradition; the first movement is written in the unusual  meter.

Chichester Psalms significantly features the harp; the full orchestral version requires two intricate harp parts. Bernstein completed the harp parts before composing the accompanying orchestral and choral parts, thus granting the harpists a pivotal role in realizing the music. In rehearsals, he is noted to have requested that the harpists play through the piece before the rest of the orchestra to emphasize the importance of the harps' role.

Recordings 
Chichester Psalms was recorded in 1986 conducted by Richard Hickox. With Bernstein's approval, the solo part was sung by Aled Jones, then a treble. A 2003 recording was performed by Thomas Kelly (treble) and the Bournemouth Symphony Chorus and Orchestra, conducted by Marin Alsop.

References

External links 
 
 
 Chichester Psalms bernstein.classical.org
 Andrew McGregor: Bernstein Chichester Psalms Review BBC 2003
 Susan Lewis: Why The Unusual Chichester Psalms is Quintessential Leonard Bernstein wrti.org May 25, 2018
 Michael Slon: "Three Windows into Leonard Bernstein's Chichester Psalms" The Choral Journal, December 2018   

Compositions by Leonard Bernstein
Choral compositions
1965 compositions
Psalm settings